Metallogeny is the study of the genesis and regional-to-global distribution of mineral deposits, with emphasis on their relationship in space and time to regional petrologic and tectonic features of the Earth's crust.
The term metallogeny (métallogénie) was created by Louis de Launay, a professor at the Ecole des Mines de Paris, in his 1913 book.

References
 De Launay, Louis, 1913, Traité de métallogénie : gîtes minéraux et métallifères : gisements, recherche, production et commerce des minéraux utiles et minerais, description des principales mines (3 volumes), Paris, C. Béranger, 1913 lire en ligne à partir du premier volume [archive]
 Guilbert, John M., and Charles F. Park Jr., 1986, Geology of Ore Deposits, Chapter 21, Freeman, 
 Jébrak, Michel, and Marcoux, Éric, 2014, Geology of Mineral Resources. Geological Society of Canada WorldCat
Pohl W.L. (2020) Economic Geology, Principles and Practice: Metals, Minerals, Coal and Hydrocarbons – an Introduction to Formation and Sustainable Exploitation of Mineral Deposits. 2nd ed. 755 pp. 32 Colour Plates, 305 Figures, 32 Tables, 25 Boxes,  81 Equations. Schweizerbart Science Publishers, Stuttgart.         www.schweizerbart.de/9783510654352 (Soft Cover)

Economic geology